Silinskaya-2 is a rural locality (a village) in Morozovskoye Rural Settlement, Verkhovazhsky District, Vologda Oblast, Russia. The population was 9 in 2002.

Geography 
Silinskaya-2 is located 34 km west of Verkhovazhye (the district's administrative centre) by road. Bushnitskaya is the nearest rural locality.

References 

Rural localities in Verkhovazhsky District